Cássio Luís Rissardo known as Xuxa (born 31 August 1981) is a Brazilian footballer who plays for Mirassol.

Biography
Born in São Paulo, Xuxa started his professional career at Mirassol. At first he signed a -year contract in July 2003. He was signed by Marília in January 2005 and in July loaned to Portuguesa for 2005 Campeonato Brasileiro Série B. However, Xuxa only played twice, on 8 July and 12 July as substitutes. He also spent the first half of the year at Mirassol, for 2005 São Paulo state championship.

In 2006 season at first he played for América (RN), and in June left for Vila Nova. In September he was signed by Anapolina until the end of 2006 Série C. Xuxa returned to Marília in January 2007 but left for Sertãozinho on free transfer in June 2007. After played in 2007 Copa Paulista, Xuxa returned to Marília again in short-term deal in January 2008. He scored nine goals for Marília during the 2008 Campeonato Paulista.

In April 2008 Xuxa was signed by Juventude in -year contract. He played for the team at Rio Grande do Sul state championship and 2008 Brazilian Série B.

In January 2009 he was signed by Grêmio Barueri in 1-year loan. However, after his only appearance in 2009 Brazilian Série A, Xuxa moved back to Série B for São Caetano in July.

In December 2009 Xuxa joined Botafogo (SP) on free transfer, where he played in the state championship. In May 2010 he was signed by Santo André in 2-year contract. The club relegated from 2010 Brazilian Série B at the end of season. In December 2010 he was re-signed by Mirassol in short-term deal. He scored 8 goals in 2011 state championship.

In May 2011 he was signed by Vitória in -year contract, joining keeper Fernando. Xuxa played 14 games only in 2011 Brazilian Série B. In January 2012 both players were allowed to return to Mirassol but Xuxa was in temporary deal.

References

External links
 

Brazilian footballers
Marília Atlético Clube players
Mirassol Futebol Clube players
Associação Portuguesa de Desportos players
América Futebol Clube (RN) players
Vila Nova Futebol Clube players
Associação Atlética Anapolina players
Sertãozinho Futebol Clube players
Esporte Clube Juventude players
Grêmio Barueri Futebol players
Associação Desportiva São Caetano players
Botafogo Futebol Clube (SP) players
Esporte Clube Santo André players
Esporte Clube Vitória players
Al-Raed FC players
Associação Atlética Flamengo players
Association football midfielders
Footballers from São Paulo
1981 births
Living people
Saudi Professional League players